Richard Garfield Jenkin (9 October 1925 – 29 October 2002), was a Cornish nationalist politician and one of the founding members of Mebyon Kernow. He was also a Grand Bard of the Gorseth Kernow.

Cornish language 
In 1947, Jenkin was made a Bard of the Gorseth Kernow through Cornish language qualification, while serving in the British Army. He chose the bardic name Map Dyvroeth, meaning 'son of exile'.

He was a Grand Bard of the Gorseth Kernow twice, between 1976 and 1982 and between 1985 and 1988.

Jenkin was secretary of the International Celtic Congress and later its president. He gave strong support to the Cornish Constitutional Convention. He was president of the Federation of Old Cornwall Societies from 1991 to 1992.

Political career
In 1951, Jenkin was one of the founding members of the Cornish nationalist party Mebyon Kernow. Jenkin and his wife produced a magazine in 1952 called New Cornwall, which publicised Mebyon Kernow news and policies.

He served as the party's chairman between 1973 and 1983 and became its Honorary President in 1988.

Jenkin was MK's first candidate for both the House of Commons and the European Parliament. Jenkin fought two Westminster parliamentary elections (Falmouth and Camborne in 1970 and St Ives in 1983). In 1979 he stood for the European parliamentary constituency on a platform of a “Cornwall Only” seat rather than one shared with part of Devon and polled 10,205 votes, 5.9% of the total vote.

He was a member of Crowan Parish Council from 1964 until 1995.

Personal life 
Jenkin was born on 9 October 1925 in Ilkeston, Derbyshire, where his Cornish father was in training as a clergyman.

Jenkin married , from Redruth in 1954; their marriage produced: four children, Morwenna, Loveday, Gawen and Conan. Ann became the first female Grand Bard from 1997 until 2000, and has served as the Honorary President of Mebyon Kernow since 2011. Loveday served as the party's leader between 1990 and 1997.

Jenkin read Chemistry at Manchester University and taught in Plymouth, Monmouthsire and Totnes before he settled in Leedstown in 1960, where he taught at Helston School.

He died in Truro on 29 October 2002, aged 77.

Publications

Early life of R. M. Nance ed. Richard & Ann Jenkin (1961).
Cornwall the Hidden Land (with Ann Trevenen Jenkin, introduction by Philip Payton), Bracknell : West Country Publications, 1965.
Book of Sermons in Cornish produced by R.G. Jenkin (1983)
40 Years of Mebyon Kernow, by Richard Jenkin and others. Publisher: Mebyon Kernow (1991) 
Cornwall the Hidden Land (with Ann Trevenen Jenkin,new introduction by Philip Payton), 2nd edition, including new material,  Leedstown: Noonvares Press, (2005) 
Delyow Derow (Oak Leaves) - Cornish Language Literary Magazine, vols 1-15 (1988-1996)
New Cornwall - Political magazine. Founded by Richard Gendall in 1952.  Edited by Richard and Ann Jenkin from 1956 to 1973.

References

1925 births
2002 deaths
People from Ilkeston
Grand Bards of Gorsedh Kernow
Writers from Cornwall
Cornish language
Cornish-speaking people
Cornish nationalists
Mebyon Kernow politicians
Leaders of political parties in the United Kingdom
20th-century English politicians
20th-century English writers
20th-century British Army personnel
Alumni of the Victoria University of Manchester